Year 174 (CLXXIV) was a common year starting on Friday (link will display the full calendar) of the Julian calendar. At the time, it was known as the Year of the Consulship of Gallus and Flaccus (or, less frequently, year 927 Ab urbe condita). The denomination 174 for this year has been used since the early medieval period, when the Anno Domini calendar era became the prevalent method in Europe for naming years.

Events 
 By place 
 Roman Empire 
 Empress Faustina the Younger accompanies her husband, Marcus Aurelius, on various military campaigns and enjoys the love of the Roman soldiers. Aurelius gives her the title of Mater Castrorum ("Mother of the Camp").
 Marcus Aurelius officially confers the title Fulminata ("Thundering") to the Legio XII Fulminata.

 Asia 
 Reign in India of Yajnashri Satakarni, Satavahana king of the Andhra. He extends his empire from the center to the north of India.

 By topic 
 Art and Science 
 Meditations by Marcus Aurelius is written, in Greek, while on military campaigns in Pannonia (approximate date).

Births 
 Gao Rou, Chinese general and politician (d. 263)
 Jia Kui, Chinese general and politician (d. 228)
 Tuoba Liwei, Chinese leader of the Tuoba clan  (d. 277)
 Zhuge Jin, Chinese general and politician (d. 241)

Deaths 
 Soter (or Sorterius), bishop of Rome (approximate date)
 Tiberius Julius Eupator, Roman client king

References